Cave Hill can refer to:
Cave Hill, Saint Lucy, Barbados, a populated place
Cave Hill, Saint Michael, Barbados, a suburban area, home to a campus of University of the West Indies